Centruroides jaragua is a species of scorpion in the family Buthidae.

References

Buthidae
Animals described in 1999
Centruroides
Arthropods of the Dominican Republic